The Sinfonieorchester Aachen is the concert and opera orchestra of the Theater Aachen. It consists of about 70 musicians and performs about 140 times a year.

History 
The Sinfonieorchester Aachen, formerly known as Städtisches Orchester Aachen, is one of the oldest orchestras in Germany that is directed by the city. In the beginning it consisted of military musicians of the city guard, supported by part-time string players. It was not until 1771 that the musicians applied for the establishment and performance of so-called concerts for the amusement of the respectable people, which had not existed in this form in Aachen before. In 1787 Georg Zethner became the first Kapellmeister of the symphony orchestra. For the performance of Haydn's Oratorio The Creation in 1803, about half of the total of 48 orchestra members had been invited from outside to join the orchestra. On the occasion of the inauguration of the new municipal theatre on 28 March 1825 as part of the eighth Niederrheinisches Musikfest, which was held for the first time in Aachen, the orchestra including the choir was increased to 422 members in order to be able to perform under the direction of Ferdinand Ries. to be able to perform Beethoven's Symphony No. 9, although at that time some difficult passages were discreetly omitted. From then on, the orchestra regularly took part in this music festival, which was held until 1958, alternating between the cities of Elberfeld, Düsseldorf, Cologne and Aachen. It was occasionally conducted by foreign guest conductors such as Felix Mendelssohn Bartholdy, Julius Rietz, Max Bruch, Carl Reinecke, Richard Strauss, Hans Pfitzner, Clemens Krauss and Felix Weingartner. Guest performers such as the only 12-year-old César Franck also appeared more and more frequently. (1835), Johann Strauss, father (1836) or Jacques Offenbach (1843) with the orchestra. In 1841, the symphony orchestra made its first major tour abroad, leading to France.

After the foundation of the Aachener Instrumentalverein in 1844, which was to strengthen the city orchestra, the city council decided in 1852 to transform the orchestra, which was still made up of recreational musicians, into a permanent institution, which now employed professional musicians on a salaried basis. The Aachen Symphony Orchestra was thus the first of its kind in the Rhineland. From this time on, the orchestra also offered regular winter subscriptions, musical project weeks and, from 1910, the well-known spa concerts. Depending on the programme, they were accompanied by various choral societies and choirs, which had been formed in large numbers in those years. To support the orchestra and as a link to the public, the "Gesellschaft der Theater- und Musikfreunde Aachen" was founded in 1924. In the meantime, the society has changed its name to accelerando – Freunde des Sinfonieorchester Aachen e.V.

During the Second World War, concert operations were maintained as far as possible. However, some of the performances took place in the auditorium or Talbothalle of the RWTH Aachen and in the Aachen Cathedral. After the war, the orchestra began to perform in a fortnightly rhythm from 1945 onwards, with performances from the Cathedral Music series. In 1946, it performed at the first music festival in the Steinfeld Abbey. After the reopening of the municipal theatre in 1951, the symphony orchestra used it as a concert hall. In the same year, it also resumed the spa concerts which had been interrupted during the war, and from 1958 it took over the musical arrangement of the  again.

Some later very famous conductors like Fritz Busch, Herbert von Karajan and Wolfgang Sawallisch started their career in Aachen.

Kapellmeister and music directors 
 1787–1794 Georg Zethner (municipal Kapellmeister)
 1804–1823 Karl Matthias Engels
 1823–1825 Paul Kreutzer (new title: Municipal Director of Music)
 1825–1827 Justus Amadeus Lecerf
 1828–1832 Wilhelm Telle
 1834–1835 Ferdinand Ries
 1835–1840 Anton Felix Schindler (at the same time also  at the Aachener Dom)
 1841–1842 Wenzel Heinrich Veit
 1842–1857 Karl von Turanyi
 1858–1865 Franz Wüllner
 1865–1883 Ferdinand Breunung
 1884–1887 Julius Kniese
 1887–1912 Eberhard Schwickerath (1893–1898 Leo Blech, Kapellmeister)
 1912–1919 Fritz Busch
 1920–1935 Peter Raabe (new title: General Music Director) (1927–1932 Paul Pella musikalischer Oberleiter)
 1935–1942 Herbert von Karajan
 1942–1944 Paul van Kempen
 1945–1946 Theodor Bernhard Rehmann (provisional, full-time cathedral conductor 1924-1963)
 1946–1953 Felix Raabe (son of Peter Raabe)
 1953–1958 Wolfgang Sawallisch
 1958–1962 Hans Walter Kämpfel
 1962–1975 Wolfgang Trommer
 1974–1983 Gabriel Chmura
 1983–1984 Jean-François Monnard  (Provisional music director)
 1984–1990 Yoram David
 1990–1992 Bruce Ferden
 1992–1993 Stefan Lano (Provisional music director)
 1993–1996 Yukio Kitahara
 1996–1997 Elio Boncompagni (Provisional music director)
 1997–2002 Elio Boncompagni
 2002–2012 Marcus Bosch
 2012–2017 Kazem Abdullah
 2017–2018 Justus Thorau (Provisional  general music director)
 from 2018 Christopher Ward

Recording 
Marcus Bosch with the Sinfonieorchester Aachen
 Ludwig van Beethoven: Missa solemnis, Alexandra Coku (soprano), Daniela Denschlag (alto), Andreas Scheidegger (tenor), Martin Berner (bass), Choir of the vocapella, live recording of the cathedral concert on 9 February 2008, (Coviello Classics)
 Johannes Brahms: Symphony No. 1 C minor op. 68 and Symphony No. 4 in E minor op. 98, 2007 (Coviello Classics)
 Johannes Brahms: A German Requiem op 45, Live recording of the cathedral concert of 24 February 2007 (Coviello Classics)
 Anton Bruckner: Symphony No. 8 in C minor, live recording of the concert "Bruckner in St. Nikolaus" on 9 June 2003 (Coviello Classics)
 Anton Bruckner: Symphony No. 7 in E major, live recording of the concert "Bruckner in St. Nikolaus" on 31 May 2004 (Coviello Classics)
 Anton Bruckner: Symphony No. 5 B flat major, live recording of the concert "Bruckner in St. Nikolaus" on 16 May 2005 (Coviello Classics)
 Anton Bruckner: Symphony No. 3 in D minor, live recording of the concert "Bruckner in St. Nikolaus" on 5 June 2006 (Coviello Classics)
 Anton Bruckner: Symphony No. 4 in E flat major, live recording of the concert "Bruckner in St. Nicholas" on 1 June 2008 (Coviello Classics)
 Anton Bruckner: Symphony No. 2 in C minor, live recording of the concert "Bruckner in St. Nikolaus" on 24 May 2010 (Coviello Classics)
 Anton Bruckner: Symphony No. 6 in A major, live recording of the concert "Bruckner in St. Nikolaus" on 1 June 2009 (Coviello Classics)
 Anton Bruckner: Symphony No. 9 in D minor, live recording of the "Bruckner concert in St. Nicholas" on 28 May 2007 (Coviello Classics)
 Georg Friedrich Händel: Alexanderfestkonzert HWV 318 – oder Die Macht der Musik, Live recording of the concert in the Old Kurhaus on 5 May 2007
 Gustav Mahler: Symphony No. 2 in C minor "Auferstehung", Carola Höhn (soprano), Anke Vondung (mezzo-soprano), Live recording of the concert on the occasion of the reopening of the Eurogress Aachen 17 September 2005
 Felix Mendelssohn Bartholdy: Symphony No. 1 in C minor, op 11 and Symphony No. 5 D major/d minor, op. 107, Live recording of the 7th and 8th symphony concert 2009 (Coviello Classics/Deutschlandradion  Kultur)
 Wolfgang Amadeus Mozart: Krönungsmesse KV 317, Exsultate, jubilate KV 165, Vesperae solennes de Confessore KV 339, Ave verum KV 618, Dorothee Mields (soprano), Mélanie Forgeron (mezzo-soprano), Christoph Wittmann (tenor), Martin Berner (baritone), Chor der vocapella, Live recording of the cathedral concert on 4 March 2006 (Coviello Classics)
 Wolfgang Amadeus Mozart: concertos for two pianos KV 365, piano duo Anna and Ines Walachowski (Oehms Classics)
 Wolfgang Amadeus Mozart: Requiem d-Moll KV 626, Ave verum KV 618, Judith Kuhn (soprano), Gabriele May (alto), Michael König (tenor), Claudius Muth (bass), Choir of the vocapella, Live recording of the cathedral concert on 8 March 2003 (Verlag Friedrich Bischoff GmbH)
 Marijn Simons: Secret notes op. 19, a tí te toca op. 23, symphony No. 1 op. 26, piano duo Anna & Ines Walachowski, Live recording of the symphony concert on 15 and 16 December 2004 (NorthWest Classics)
 Mikis Theodorakis: Rhapsody for Cello and Orchestra, Suite from Les amants de Téruel, Johannes Moser (violoncello), Live recording of the concert for the award of the IMC-UNESCO Music Prize to Mikis Theodorakis on 4 November 2005 (Coviello Classics)
 Giuseppe Verdi: Messa da Requiem, Melba Ramos (soprano), Gabriele May (Alt), Michael Ende (tenor), Martin Blasius (bass), Choir of the vocapella, Live recording of the cathedral concert on 12 February 2005, (Coviello Classics)

Further reading 
 : Theater und Musik in Aachen seit dem Beginn der preussischen Herrschaft.
 Part II in ZAGV 26 (1904), .
 Part III in ZAGV 39 (1917), .
 Alfons Fritz: Die Entwicklung der Aachener Stadtmusik vom städtischen Harmoniekorps zum städtischen Orchester (1721–1852) und ihre Beziehung zur Münstermusik. In ZAGV, 48/49 (1926/27), .
 Tonarten einer Stadt – eine Zeitreise durch die Aachener Musikgeschichte, published by Lutz Felbick, 292 pages, 304 Abbildungen, Bibliographie mit 502 Titeln (Schriftenreihe Sammlung Crous; 11), Aachen 2018. . [Authors: A. Beaujean (+), L. Felbick, N. Jers, H. Leuchter and T. Mengler].
 MGG Online in Die Musik in Geschichte und Gegenwart

References

External links 
 
 

German orchestras
Aachen